"All I Need" is a power ballad written by Sharon den Adel and  Robert Westerholt for Within Temptation's fourth studio album The Heart of Everything (2007).

Lyrics
In an interview, Within Temptation vocalist Sharon den Adel discussed "All I Need":

Music video
The video for this single was shot on 30 September in Berlin. It was released online on 19 October 2007. The video consists of a dream world in the mind of Sharon's character. The band is shown tied to walls of their cells, along with various surrealistic scenes. In the end of the video Sharon is shown in a hospital bed with images from the dream sequence flickering on a screen connected to her mind via wires.

In an interview, den Adel discussed some elements of the video:

The video contains many elements and imagery from the 2000 movie The Cell.

Usage in other media
The song was first featured on the episode Miss Mystic Falls, from American television series The Vampire Diaries. The song was covered by German gregorian chant group Gregorian for their thirteenth album, Dark Side of the Chant. During the fourth season of Belgian television show Liefde voor muziek, in which each week guest artists cover a song from another selected artist, the song was covered by Helmut Lotti for den Adel's homage day and later selected for appearing on the official album release from the season.

Formats and track listings
These are the formats and track listings of major single releases of "All I Need".

5-track digipack single
"All I Need" (single version)
"All I Need" (album version)
"The Last Time" (demo version)
"Frozen" (demo version)
"Our Solemn Hour" (demo version)

2-track single
"All I Need" (single version)
"All I Need" (album version)

iTunes download single
"All I Need" (single version)
"All I Need" (album version)
"Hand Of Sorrow" (demo version)
"Ice Queen" (acoustic live)

Charts

Weekly charts

Year-end charts

References

2007 singles
Within Temptation songs
Songs written by Sharon den Adel
Songs written by Robert Westerholt
Heavy metal ballads
2007 songs
Roadrunner Records singles